Wenceslao is a Spanish masculine given name, derived from Wenceslaus, itself a Latinized version of the Slavic names Vyacheslav, Václav, Wacław, Więcesław, Ventsislav etc. It may refer to:

 Wences Casares (born 1974), Argentine entrepreneur
 Wenceslao Carrillo Alonso-Forjador, Spanish Socialist leader, father of Santiago Carrillo
 Wenceslao Díaz (born 1987), Mexican retired footballer
 Wenceslao Díaz Gallegos (1834–1895), Chilean scientist and surgeon 
 Wenceslao Fernández Flórez ((1885–1964), Spanish journalist and novelist
 Wenceslao Figuereo (1834–1910), Dominican politician
 Wenceslao Herrera Coyac (born 1948), Mexican politician
 Wenceslao Moguel (c. 1890–1976), Mexican soldier in the Mexican Revolution who survived execution by firing squad
 Wenceslao Moreno (1896–1999), Spanish ventriloquist known as "Señor Wences"
 Wenceslao Vinzons (1910–1942), Filipino politician and guerilla leader against the Japanese occupation

Spanish masculine given names